Claybrooke Parva is a village and civil parish in the Harborough district south west Leicestershire, England close to Claybrooke Magna. The village is the site of a church which is thought to originally be part Anglo Saxon with Norman and Medieval additions. The population of the civil parish at the 2011 census was 208.

The village's name means 'brook with clayey soil'.

References

External links

The Claybrookes (archive from 4 February 2012)

Villages in Leicestershire
Civil parishes in Harborough District